The United Bank Limited Sports Complex is a cricket ground in Karachi, Pakistan. It was the home ground of the United Bank Limited cricket team. The complex contains facilities for basketball, cricket, field hockey, tennis, and table tennis, and occupies around 17 acres of area.

Since its establishment in 1992, the ground has hosted more than 120 first-class matches.

History
United Bank Limited Sports Complex was established in 1992 by United Bank Limited on an amenity plot awarded by the government under Martial Law Ordinance (MLO), to private organizations to build sport facilities in the city.

It was selected as a venue to host matches in the 2016–17 Quaid-e-Azam Trophy. In September 2019, the Pakistan Cricket Board named it as one of the venues to host matches in the 2019–20 Quaid-e-Azam Trophy.

See also
 List of cricket grounds in Pakistan

References

External links
United Bank Limited Sports Complex at CricketArchive

Cricket grounds in Pakistan
1992 establishments in Pakistan
Sports venues completed in 1992